Major League Baseball 2K12 or, in short, MLB 2K12, is a Major League Baseball licensed baseball simulation video game published by 2K Sports that was released for the PlayStation 2, PlayStation 3, PlayStation Portable, Wii, Nintendo DS, Xbox 360, and Microsoft Windows on March 6, 2012. This was the last MLB game to be released for the PlayStation 2. The commentary is delivered by the trio of Steve Phillips, Gary Thorne, and John Kruk.

Cover athlete

Justin Verlander of the Detroit Tigers is the game's cover athlete replacing Roy Halladay from MLB 2K11. Verlander won both the AL Cy Young Award and the AL MVP Award in 2011.

Modes
The Perfect Game Challenge is a competition where players will compete to pitch a perfect game in MLB 2K12.
MLB Today Season Mode
Franchise Mode is a mode where a player can play through multiple MLB seasons with one team, all while signing free agents, making trades, drafting players and setting rosters for that team and its minor league affiliate teams. However, it is not as in depth as MLB Today Season Mode, and more than one game may be played in a day in Franchise Mode. You can edit your players abilities in all areas unlimited times, making it possible to make your entire team perfect. 

You can also edit their contract values and adjust the sliders or difficulty level during a franchise.

Changes from the previous installments
MLB 2K12 makes pitcher and batter interactions more realistic than ever before, as certain pitches will decrease or increase in effectiveness against certain players, depending on their strengths and weaknesses.
MLB 2K12 has a new throwing system and variation and realism in the hits.
MLB 2K12 features improved gameplay from the previous installments, including improved AI, as well as improved graphics and lighting.
MLB 2K12 features all of the real life MLB logos, uniforms, and ballparks.

End of the Series
2K Sports gave many signals on May 22, 2012, that the game would mark the end of the MLB 2K series. The game was left off the list of games for 2K's 2013 fiscal year, which was the same way they signaled the end of the NHL 2K series (although it returned on mobile devices in 2014) and the College Hoops series. A spokesman for Take Two commented, "Our legacy Major League Baseball agreement will sunset in fiscal 2013. MLB 2K12 is our last offering under that agreement. At this time, we have no further comment."

However, on January 9, 2013, 2K Sports eventually announced that they had reached an agreement with Major League Baseball, the Major League Baseball Players Association, and Major League Baseball Advanced Media to release Major League Baseball 2K13. The game was released on March 5, 2013. MLB 2K13 was the final installment of the series.

Soundtrack
The following soundtrack was confirmed on February 17, 2012.

Reception 

Major League Baseball 2K12 received "mixed or average" reviews, according to review aggregator Metacritic.

GamesRadar wrote, "Despite its many issues, MLB 2K12 packs a significant punch when it comes to the nuts-and-bolts of big league baseball...Unfortunately, it's just too ordinary-looking and choppy-playing...For all its good points, a game of this stature should be more polished at this stage of the franchise's existence."

References

See also

MLB 12: The Show

2012 video games
2K Sports games
Major League Baseball video games
Sports video games with career mode
PlayStation 2 games
PlayStation 3 games
PlayStation Portable games
Wii games
Nintendo DS games
Xbox 360 games
Windows games
Sports video games set in the United States
Multiplayer and single-player video games
Take-Two Interactive games
MLB 2K
Video games developed in the United States
Video games set in Maryland